The Mannar mass grave, discovered in 2013, is located in Mannar, Sri Lanka.

The exact time period the grave was created is unknown and has been determined to be between 1499 and 1719 AD by carbon testing.

Overview

The press and media carried the news in headlines following the excavation conducted by the Sri Lankan authorities in Mannar  which led to the discovery of a mass grave in 2013.  

According to the police, the site was allegedly used for mass burial of civilians and soldiers alike killed by the Tamil rebels during the war. 

Mannar  and most of the northern part of Sri Lanka were under the control of the rebels for almost 30 long years. The long battle  ended in May 2009 after the government forces vanquished the Tamil rebels. The discovery of the Mannar grave led to further investigation in Matale, central Sri Lanka, which bore 150 human skeletons. 

The Director General of Archaeological Department of Sri Lanka whom had been instructed by the Mannar Magistrate to investigate and report on the "Mass Grave",  announced on 8 April 2014,  that the site is a normal burial ground which had been used since 1930s. He had further explained, how it had been identified as a normal burial ground and not a mass grave, but proposed further investigations.  

Carbon dating of the skeletons tested from the mass grave belonged to an era from 1499 to 1719 AD. The carbon testing was carried out by the Beta Analytic Institute of Florida, USA. The Mannar magistrate has ordered that this report be made public.

References

2014 in Sri Lanka
Massacres in Sri Lanka
History of Mannar District
Mass graves in Sri Lanka